The Lumière Film Festival is an annual film festival held each October in Lyon Metropolis, France, since 2009. The festival is named in honor of the Lumière Brothers, who invented the Cinematography in Lyon in 1895, and is organized by the Institut Lumière.

The festival focuses on the history of cinema with the line-up dedicated to the works of the past through restored prints, retrospectives and tributes. The Lumière Award (Prix Lumière), an award that recognizes the achievement and contributions of an international film personality, is also presented annually at the festival.

Lumière Award recipients

References 

Auguste and Louis Lumière
Film festivals in France
2009 establishments in France
Culture in Lyon